Oriol Romeu Vidal (born 24 September 1991) is a Spanish professional footballer who plays as a defensive midfielder for La Liga side Girona.

Romeu began his career at Barcelona, playing mainly in their reserves. In 2011, he joined Chelsea for €5 million, spending time on loan at Valencia and VfB Stuttgart before moving to Southampton four years later. He played 256 times for Southampton before returning to La Liga with Girona in 2022.

Romeu represented Spain up to under-21 level, and was part of their under-17 team which won the 2008 European Championship. He also played for the country at the 2012 Olympics.

Club career

Barcelona
Born in Ulldecona, Tarragona, Catalonia, Romeu started his career at local CF Ulldecona. He arrived in FC Barcelona's youth academy in 2004, from neighbours RCD Espanyol, and progressed through the club's youth academy until breaking into the reserve team. Manager Pep Guardiola handed him his first appearance for the senior side in a friendly against Kuwaiti team Kazma Sporting Club, and subsequently included him in the squad for the 2009 FIFA Club World Cup which took place in Abu Dhabi.

Romeu was included in the nineteen-man Barcelona squad on 13 August 2010, due to the need to rest some of Barcelona's Spanish internationals. He was to face Sevilla in the first leg of the season's Spanish Supercup. He made his official competitive debut in that game, playing the full ninety minutes in the 1–3 away loss.

Romeu made his first La Liga appearance on 15 May 2011, playing the last ten minutes of a 0–0 home draw against Deportivo de La Coruña in the place of another club youth graduate, Jonathan dos Santos.

Chelsea

Reports began to link Romeu with a move to Chelsea on 22 July 2011. The following day he agreed terms for his transfer, pending a medical or personal terms as he was away on international duty at the 2011 FIFA U-20 World Cup. On 4 August the English club announced the completion of the transfer, with the player signing a four-year contract in a deal worth €5 million – the deal also gave Barcelona first refusal via a buy back option should Chelsea deem him surplus to requirements, seeing Barcelona pay €10 million in 2012 or €15 million in 2013 to bring him back to the Camp Nou; he was given the number 6 shirt for the new campaign.

Romeu made his official debut for Chelsea on 10 September 2011, being brought on as a substitute in the 79th minute of the 2–1 away win against Sunderland. He received his first start on the 21st, in a 0–0 draw (penalty shootout win) against Fulham for the season's Football League Cup.

Romeu's first UEFA Champions League appearance came on 19 October 2011, playing the full 90 minutes in a 5–0 group stage home win against K.R.C. Genk. His first start in the Premier League was against Wolverhampton Wanderers on 26 November, putting in a solid performance in a 3–0 home win.

In December 2011, Chelsea issued a statement regarding the deal surrounding Romeu's buy back clause with Barcelona. The statement highlighted that the Blaugrana did not have an automatic buy back clause as first suggested, only having first refusal on any deal if the Blues wanted to sell him in the future.

On 25 September 2012, Romeu scored his first goal for Chelsea, taking a penalty in a 6–0 win against Wolves at Stamford Bridge for the season's League Cup. Manager Roberto Di Matteo stated that the departures of Yossi Benayoun, Michael Essien and Raul Meireles would mean more playing opportunities for the Spaniard; however, on 11 December, he suffered a knee injury in a game against Sunderland, being sidelined for the rest of the season.

Loan to Valencia
On 12 July 2013, Romeu returned to Spain and joined Valencia in a season-long loan deal. He made his debut for the club on 15 September, in a 3–1 defeat at Real Betis. In February, during training Romeu suffered another knee injury that kept him out of action for a month. During his time with Valencia, Romeu played a total of 18 games.

Loan to Stuttgart
On 17 July 2014, Romeu signed a new contract with Chelsea, keeping him at the club until 2017. On 4 August, however, he was loaned to VfB Stuttgart in Germany. He made his debut twenty days later in a 1–1 draw at Borussia Mönchengladbach.

Southampton

On 13 August 2015, Romeu joined Southampton for £5 million on a three-year deal. He made his debut two days later, as a half-time substitute for Dušan Tadić in a 3–0 home defeat to Everton, earning a booking after three minutes for a foul on James McCarthy. He scored his first goal for the Saints – and first in a professional league – on 5 December, equalising for a 1–1 draw against Aston Villa at St Mary's Stadium.

After missing only one league game all season for Claude Puel's Saints, Romeu signed a new four-and-a-half-year deal on 24 January 2017. Puel compared Romeu to Chelsea player N'Golo Kanté. He was voted the club's Player of the Season, at the end of a campaign that saw them reach the EFL Cup Final.

In November 2020, Romeu signed a new contract to keep him at Southampton until the summer of 2023. On 23 February 2021, he produced “one of the greatest tackles of all time” after he made up a serious amount of ground to prevent Leeds United forward Raphinha from scoring, but the game ended in a 3–0 defeat. In the same game, he picked up an ankle injury and required surgery, which was expected to see him miss the remainder of the season. However, he was able to make an appearance on the final day of the 2020–21 season, replacing Kyle Walker-Peters in Southampton’s 3–0 defeat to West Ham United.

Girona 
On 1 September 2022, Romeu completed a permanent transfer to Girona.

International career
He participated in the 2008 UEFA European Under-17 Football Championship with Spain, playing four matches and helping his country to eventual victory in the tournament.

After making his professional début for Barcelona in 2009, Romeu became a mainstay in the under-19 and under-20 national teams, featuring heavily in the 2010 UEFA Under-19 Championship elite qualification round.

He was part of the Spanish squad which was eliminated from its group at the 2012 Olympics, coming on as a substitute in their first match and starting the last.

In March 2019, Romeu was called up by Catalonia for a friendly against Venezuela. He made his debut as a second-half substitute in the 2–1 win in Girona.

Personal life
Romeu, who is known for his interest in literature, wrote an autobiography La temporada de mi vida, el viaje interior de un futbolista (The season of my life, the inside voyage of a footballer).

Career statistics

Honours
Barcelona
Supercopa de España: 2010

Chelsea
FA Cup: 2011–12
UEFA Champions League: 2011–12

Southampton
EFL Cup runner-up: 2016–17

Spain U17
UEFA European Under-17 Championship: 2008

Spain U19
UEFA European Under-19 Championship runner-up: 2010

Individual
Southampton Player of the Season: 2016–17

References

External links

 Profile at the Girona FC website
 
 Futbolme profile  
 
 
 

1991 births
Living people
People from Montsià
Sportspeople from the Province of Tarragona
Spanish footballers
Footballers from Catalonia
Association football defenders
Association football midfielders
Association football utility players
La Liga players
Segunda División players
Segunda División B players
FC Barcelona Atlètic players
FC Barcelona players
Valencia CF players
Premier League players
Chelsea F.C. players
Southampton F.C. players
Bundesliga players
VfB Stuttgart players
Girona FC players
Spain youth international footballers
Spain under-21 international footballers
Spain under-23 international footballers
Olympic footballers of Spain
Footballers at the 2012 Summer Olympics
Spanish expatriate footballers
Expatriate footballers in England
Expatriate footballers in Germany
Spanish expatriate sportspeople in England
Spanish expatriate sportspeople in Germany
Articles containing video clips
UEFA Champions League winning players
Catalonia international footballers
RCD Espanyol footballers